Islotes Las Galeras, are a pair of small islands in the Gulf of California east of the Baja California Peninsula, and just 3/4 miles (about 1 km) north of Isla Monserrate. The islands are uninhabited and part of the Loreto Municipality.

Biology
Islotes Las Galeras has only one species of reptile, Uta stansburiana (common side-blotched lizard).

References

Further reading

Islands of the Gulf of California
Islands of Baja California Sur
Loreto Municipality (Baja California Sur)
Uninhabited islands of Mexico